Catharine Valley Trail is a state park and recreation trail located in Schuyler and Chemung counties, New York. The park is located near Watkins Glen State Park and maintained by its staff, as well as by volunteers.

Description
The park encompasses a recreation trail that follows abandoned railroad grades and canal towpaths between Watkins Glen and Horseheads. The trail is level and finished with crushed limestone, and is wheelchair-accessible. The trail is open year-round, and allows for walking, biking, cross-country skiing, and snowshoeing.

History
Catharine Valley is named for Catherine Montour, a prominent Seneca leader who died in the late eighteenth century.

Portions of the park's trail are built upon towpaths originally constructed for the Chemung Canal, which was completed in 1830 and closed in 1878. Much of the trail's remainder follows the defunct Chemung Railroad, which was built parallel to the canal in 1850. The land that became the park was donated to the New York State Office of Parks, Recreation and Historic Preservation in 1997 by Ed Hoffman, a local resident who had worked toward the creation of the park since the 1970s.

The first mile of the trail was opened in 2000.

See also
 Catharine Creek
 List of New York state parks
 Rail trail

References

External links
 New York State Parks: Catharine Valley Trail
 Catharine Valley Trail map

State parks of New York (state)
Parks in Chemung County, New York
Parks in Schuyler County, New York